Streptostyla turgidula is a species of predatory, air-breathing, land snail, a terrestrial pulmonate gastropod mollusk in the family Spiraxidae. This species is found in Costa Rica, Guatemala, and Nicaragua.

References

Spiraxidae
Gastropods described in 1856
Molluscs of Central America
Taxonomy articles created by Polbot